Gert Pettersson (born 16 January 1953) is a Swedish orienteering competitor. He is Relay World Champion from 1976, as a member of the Swedish winning team, along with Erik Johansson, Arne Johansson and Rolf Pettersson.

References

1953 births
Living people
Swedish orienteers
Male orienteers
Foot orienteers
World Orienteering Championships medalists